Huan Nguyen (born ) is a South Vietnamese engineer and retired rear admiral in the United States Navy.

Personal life
During the Tet Offensive of 1968, Nguyen's parents and six siblings were killed at their Saigon-area home by Viet Cong guerrillas. Shot in the arm, thigh, and skull, nine-year-old Nguyen stayed in the house for two hours—while his mother bled to death—and then escaped after dark. One of the men who attacked his family was Viet Cong officer Nguyễn Văn Lém, whose execution by Nguyễn Ngọc Loan was famously photographed by Eddie Adams.

Thereafter, Nguyen lived with his uncle, a colonel in the South Vietnam Air Force, until 1975 when they fled to the United States after the Fall of Saigon. Nguyen and his uncle's family first moved to Midwest City, Oklahoma, near Tinker Air Force Base.

Education
Nguyen was one of 560 graduates from Midwest City High School in 1977.  In 1981, he graduated from Oklahoma State University (OSU) with a Bachelor of Science in electrical engineering.  , he also held three master's degrees: electrical engineering from Southern Methodist University, engineering (manufacturing concentration) from Purdue University, and information technology (with highest distinction) from Carnegie Mellon University.  In 2020, Nguyen was inducted into OSU's College of Engineering, Architecture and Technology Hall of Fame and received the school's highest honor, the Melvin R. Lohmann Medal.

Career

US Navy
Nguyen was inspired to join the United States Navy after witnessing the sailors and Marines who cared for his family en route to the US in 1975.  In 1993, he was commissioned through the Reserve Engineering Duty Officer program.

Since then, he has been assigned to United States Fleet Activities Yokosuka, Naval Sea Systems Command, United States Pacific Fleet, and the Office of Naval Research.  At the United States Navy Memorial in Washington, D.C. on 10 October 2019, Nguyen became the first Vietnamese-American promoted to rear admiral.  Upon his promotion, he was assigned to Naval Sea Systems Command at the Washington Navy Yard as Deputy Commander for Cyber Engineering.

Nguyen retired from the Navy on 7 October 2022, with a retirement ceremony held at the Washington Navy Yard.  Among his awards and decorations are three Legion of Merits, a Bronze Star Medal, a Meritorious Service Medal, two Navy and Marine Corps Commendation Medals, and two Navy and Marine Corps Achievement Medals.

Civilian engineering
In August 1994, Nguyen began working for General Motors (GM) where he managed the team that designed and integrated the powertrain control module for all of GM's platforms.  In 2006, he became the senior vice president of Bank of America and established computer security standards and processes.  After joining Exelis Inc. in 2009, Nguyen "managed a multi-million-dollar portfolio of independent research and development projects on ground electronic warfare countermeasures, counter-remote improvised explosive device systems and interference mitigation systems."

References

External links
 

1950s births
21st-century American naval officers
Bank of America executives
Carnegie Mellon University alumni
General Motors people
Oklahoma State University alumni
people from Huế
people from Midwest City, Oklahoma
Purdue University alumni
recipients of the Legion of Merit
South Vietnamese people
Southern Methodist University alumni
United States Navy engineering officers
United States Navy rear admirals
Vietnamese emigrants to the United States